"The Daughter of Erlik Khan" is an El Borak short story by Robert E. Howard. It was originally published in the December 1934 issue of the pulp magazine Top-Notch.

References

External links

 List of stories and publication details at Howard Works

Short stories by Robert E. Howard
Pulp stories
1934 short stories
Works originally published in Top-Notch Magazine